Mark Larry Taufua, also known by the nicknames of "Fu", or "Taff", is a Samoan former rugby league footballer who played as a  and . He played for the Newcastle Knights and the Cronulla-Sutherland Sharks in the NRL.

Background
He was born in Newcastle, New South Wales, Australia and is of Samoan descent.

His younger brother Larry Jnr, played for the Newcastle Knights in the Jersey Flegg Cup in 2006 and 2007.

Playing career
After playing junior rugby league in Maitland Pickers for the Woodberry Warriors, Taufua switched to rugby union, playing for the Waratahs in the Newcastle and Hunter Rugby Union competition. He was a Newcastle and NSW Country rugby union representative when in 2006 Brian Smith, the Knights coach at that time discovered him. After debuting in the NRL midway through 2007, at 25, Taufua continued to improve. In 2008, a Newcastle Herald article nicknamed him "The Samoan stealth bomber" after "teeth-rattling tackles and bone-jarring charges" against the Melbourne Storm, and in 2009, played in every game for Newcastle except their first-round loss to the Gold Coast. He only missed a few games in 2010 due to injury.

On 7 June 2011, Taufua signed with the Cronulla-Sutherland Sharks for two years, starting in 2012.

Throughout the 2013 season, Taufua struggled to obtain game time in the NRL, due to the likes of Luke Lewis, Paul Gallen and Andrew Fifita, before him, but had a fitting end to his career with a stellar season as starting prop in a NSW Cup Premiership side, captained by Chad Townsend.
He announced his retirement from the game after the 2013 Rugby League World Cup.  Taufua later played for the West Newcastle Rosellas in the Newcastle Rugby League competition.

Representative career
In 2009 he was named as part of the Samoan side for the Pacific Cup.

In April 2013 he played for Samoa in their Pacific Rugby League International against fierce pacific rivals Tonga.

Later in the year, Mark played for Samoa in their successful 2013 Rugby League World Cup campaign.

Personal life
Mark Taufua is the second eldest son of Feiloivao Lilomaiava Taulave (Lave/Larry) Taufua, who is a Paramount Chief of Faleatiu, A'ana, Samoa. Taufua's father was also a Heavy Weight boxer in New Zealand during the late 70s, where his alias was "Prince Tattoo" (due to his traditional Samoan tattoo known as Tatau or Pe'a. His mother Lulu Sapaea Faofua (Taufua) of Laulii died in 1996 due to cancer.

He is the uncle of current Brisbane Broncos player Payne Haas and Gold Coast Titans player Klese Haas.

References

External links
2011 Newcastle Knights profile
Rugby League Project stats
Daily Telegraph profile

1981 births
Living people
Australian people of New Zealand descent
Australian sportspeople of Samoan descent
Australian rugby league players
Central Coast Centurions players
Cronulla-Sutherland Sharks players
Maitland Pickers players
Newcastle Knights players
People educated at St Paul's College, Auckland
Rugby league locks
Rugby league players from Newcastle, New South Wales
Rugby league props
Samoa national rugby league team players
Western Suburbs Rosellas players